The Tarragal Caves are a network of large limestone caves and rockshelters which overlook the Bridgewater Lakes near the towns of Tarragal and Cape Bridgewater, Victoria in the Charles La Trobe and are near Discovery Bay Coastal Park. The caves were identified as important Aboriginal camping places early in the historic period, and were excavated in the late 1970s by Harry Lourandos, revealing stratified deposits in the floor of 11,300 years old, along with shell midden deposits and earth ovens over 11,000 years old.

Located just off the Bridgewater Lakes Road, and accessible in part by walking track, the cave openings form a series of galleries with clear views across the surrounding landscape and lakes.

It is said that whenever Aborigines approached this, they would a piece of wood into the hole to "propitiate the demon supposed to reside within its profound and mysterious depths."

Colonial administrator Charles La Trobe visited the site in 1845 and 1846, and had some of his men lower a rope ladder over the cliff so he could explore the caves. He also provided a detailed description in 1846, noting that "...the ‘natives’ referred to it as ‘Lubras’ Cave’" and that they "...knew the caverns well and ...had a superstitious dread of them, stating that the caverns below were inhabited by headless lubras". LaTrobe noted that when they came to the point under the sink hole there was a large pile of timber, assumed to be the items thrown down by Aborigines over the ages. They then set fire to the pile lighting up the cave "... and displayed a magnificent vaulted chamber, bedecked with long glistening stalactites, and tenanted by vast numbers of bats, whose whirring, whizzing noise was probably that which the natives attributed to some supernatural being."

An early etching depicting an Aboriginal family in the cave entrance was probably inspired by La Trobe's record.

Pollen analysis of sediments in the cave has assisted in reconstructing the Pleistocene climate and environment of the region and understanding what resources were available to Aborigines.

See also
 New Guinea II cave
 Buchan Caves
 Cloggs Cave

References

Notes
 Josephine Flood, Archaeology of the Dreamtime, J. B. Publishing
 Phillip J. Habgood & Natilie R. Franklin, The revolution that didn't arrive: A review of Pleistocene Sahul, Journal of Human Evolution, 55, 2008

Pleistocene paleontological sites of Australia
History of Victoria (Australia)
Caves of Victoria (Australia)
Limestone caves
Rock shelters in Australia